In Samoan mythology, Tagaloa (also known as Tagaloa-Lagi or Tagaloa, Lagi of the Heavens/Skies) is generally accepted as the supreme ruler, the creator of the universe, the chief of all gods and the progenitor of other gods. Tagaloa Lagi dwelt in space and made the Heavens  the sky, the land, the seas, the fresh water, the trees and the people. Samoans believed Tagaloa created nine heavens.
Tagaloa's role as paramount deity in the Samoa pantheon bears similarities to the position of Ta'aroa in Tahiti and Io Matua Kore in Aotearoa New Zealand.

The arrival of missionaries and Christianity in Samoa from 1830 saw the Samoan Lagi gods like Tagaloa replaced by the Christian deity.

Tagaloa in mythology
Tagaloa features in many of Samoa's myths and legends.
 Tagaloa rolled stones from heaven. One became the island Savai'i and the other stone became the island of Upolu.
 One legend tells that Tagaloa had two children, a son Moa and a daughter Lu. Tagaloa's daughter Lu had a son, also called Lu. Young Lu argued with his uncle Moa and fled to earth which he called Samoa.
 Tagaloa is the father of gods Lagi
 Tagaloa is a sun god whose son Alo'alo married Sina, the daughter of Tuifiti. There is a legend about a figure called Tui Fiti in the village of Fagamalo on the island of Savai'i.
 In Manu'a, Tagaloa sent a vine to earth that resulted in maggots which became human beings.
 Tagaloa brought a war god called Fe'e (octopus) to Manu'a
 In Samoan architecture, Tagaloa also features in a story which explains why Samoan houses are round.

See also
 Io Matua Kore paramount deity in New Zealand Māori mythology
 Taaroa paramount deity in Tahitian mythology
 Tangaloa Tongan mythology
 Tangaroa New Zealand Maori mythology
 Kanaloa Hawaii mythology

References

Samoan deities
Polynesian deities
Creator gods